Annie Goetzinger (18 August 1951 – 20 December 2017) was a comics artist and graphic novelist from Paris, France. From the mid-1970s until her death in 2017, she worked on award-winning graphic novels as well as press cartoons for newspapers such as La Croix and Le Monde. She had a long-standing relationship with comics publisher Dargaud and the comics writer Pierre Christin.

Graphically, Goetzinger is known for her research and attention to detail, carefully rendered apparel and a style influenced by Art Nouveau. Goetzinger's background in fashion drawing and costume design shows through in her work as well. In 2016, she was recruited to illustrate a recap of New York Fashion Week for New York Magazine.

Her earliest works were illustrations for short comic stories published in French comic magazines like Pilote, Charlie Mensuel and Fluide Glacial. Goetzinger's first graphic novel, Casque d'Or, won her two awards at the 1977 Angoulême International Comics Festival.

Work
Many of her works include female protagonists and strong characters. For instance, Aurore, published in 1978 with story by Adela Turin, tells the story of the novelist best known by her pseudonym George Sand. Goetzinger's 2015 graphic novel Girl in Dior, the first of her works published in English, tells the story of a journalist named Clara who is reporting on Christian Dior's 1947 show.

In a 2015 interview, Goetzinger said, "When I started, I did not know there were so few girls making comics. ... I didn't care; I always felt like kind of a maverick."

Collaborations
In addition to writing the story and text for her own graphic novels, Goetzinger frequently collaborated with authors. She worked with French author Pierre Christin since the early 1980s and Spanish author Víctor Mora, among others.

Death
Goetzinger died on 20 December 2017, at the age of 66.

Bibliography
 Légende et réalité de Casque d'or, Glénat, 1976
 Aurore, éditions des femmes, 1978
 Curriculum BD, Les Humanoïdes Associés, 1980
 Portraits souvenirs series
 La Demoiselle de la Légion d'Honneur, story by Pierre Christin, Dargaud, 1980
 La Diva et le Kriegspiel, story by Pierre Cristin, Dargaud, 1981
 La Voyageuse de petite ceinture, story by Pierre Christin, Dargaud, 1985
 Charlotte et Nancy, story by Pierre Christin, Dargaud, 1987
 Barcelonight, Les Humanoïdes Associés, 1990
 Rayon Dames, Les Humanoïdes Associés, 1991
 L'Avenir perdu, with Jon S. Jonsson and Andreas Knigge, Les Humanoïdes Associés, 1992
 Félina, story by Víctor Mora, Dargaud
 Félina, 1982
 Les mystères de Barcelone, 1983
 L'Ogre du Djebel, 1986
 Le Tango du disparu, story by Pierre Christin, Flammarion, 1989
 Mémoires de Barcelone, text by Montserrat Roig, La Sirène, 1993
 Le Message du simple, story by Pierre Christin, Seuil, 1994
 La Sultane blanche, story by Pierre Christin, Dargaud, 1996
 Paquebot, story by Pierre Christin, Dargaud, 1999
 Agence Hardy series, story by Pierre Christin, Dargaud
 Le parfum disparu, 2001
 La Trace pâle, 2002
 Le Poison rouge, 2004
 Banlieue rouge, banlieue blanche, 2006
 Berlin, zone française, 2008
 Boulevard des crimes, 2009
 Les diamants fondent au soleil, 2012
 Marie-Antoinette, la reine fantôme, story by Rodolphe, Dargaud, 2011
 Girl in Dior, Dargaud, 2013
 Les Apprentissages de Colette, Dargaud, 2017

References

1951 births
2017 deaths
20th-century French artists
20th-century French women artists
21st-century French artists
21st-century French women artists
Artists from Paris
French female comics artists
French costume designers
French cartoonists
French women cartoonists
French women illustrators
Women costume designers